Tara Lyn Strong (née Charendoff; born February 12, 1973) is a Canadian-American actress. She is known for her voice work in animation, websites, and video games. Strong's voice roles include animated series such as The New Batman Adventures, Teen Titans, Teen Titans Go!, Rugrats, The Powerpuff Girls, The Fairly OddParents, The Proud Family, Xiaolin Showdown, Ben 10, Chowder, Wow! Wow! Wubbzy!, My Little Pony: Friendship Is Magic, Unikitty!, and DC Super Hero Girls. She has also voiced characters in the video games Mortal Kombat X, Ultimate Marvel vs. Capcom 3, Jak and Daxter, Final Fantasy X, X-2, Blue Dragon, and Batman: Arkham.

She has earned Annie Award and Daytime Emmy nominations and won an award from the Academy of Interactive Arts & Sciences.

Early life
Strong was born as Tara Lyn Charendoff in Toronto, Canada, on February 12, 1973, the younger daughter of Syd and Lucy Charendoff. Strong has called her Jewish background "a big part of her identity". She has an older sister named Marla. At age four, Strong became interested in acting and volunteered to be a soloist at a school production. She worked with the Yiddish Theater, where she memorized her lines phonetically because she did not know the Yiddish language. Strong also performed with the Toronto Jewish Theater, where she acted in A Night of Stars and was featured in an audiotape for "Lay Down Your Arms" with the Habonim Youth Choir, singing the lyrics in both English and Hebrew.

Career

Strong's first professional role was Gracie in Limelight Theater's production of The Music Man at the age of 13. She had a guest role in the action series T. and T. Her first major cartoon role, also at the age of 13, was the title role in Hello Kitty's Furry Tale Theater. Strong starred in the short-lived CBC Television sitcom Mosquito Lake. She took improv classes at The Second City in Toronto and continued acting in both animated and live-action shows and films, before moving to Los Angeles in January 1994.

Strong is the voice of numerous animated characters, including main roles in The New Batman Adventures as Barbara Gordon/Batgirl, Teen Titans and Teen Titans Go! as Raven; Fillmore! as Ingrid Third; The Fairly OddParents as Timmy Turner and Poof; Rugrats and All Grown Up! as Dil Pickles; The Powerpuff Girls as Bubbles; Ben 10 as Ben Tennyson, Upgrade, Blitzwolfer, and Buzzshock; Chowder as Truffles; Foster's Home for Imaginary Friends as Terrence; the singing voice of Meg Griffin and additional voices on Family Guy; My Little Pony: Friendship Is Magic as Twilight Sparkle, Unikitty! as the titular princess, Wow! Wow! Wubbzy! as Daizy, and Dorothy and the Wizard of Oz as Joanni.

She has also lent her voice to English-dubbed localizations of Japanese anime such as Spirited Away and Princess Mononoke, as well as several video games, including her work as Elisa and Ursula in Metal Gear Solid: Portable Ops; Paz Ortega Andrade in Metal Gear Solid: Peace Walker, Metal Gear Solid V: Ground Zeroes, and Metal Gear Solid V: The Phantom Pain; Rikku in Final Fantasy X, its sequel Final Fantasy X-2, and Kingdom Hearts II; Krista Sparks in Twisted Metal: Head-On; Talwyn Apogee in Ratchet & Clank Future: Tools of Destruction and its sequel, Ratchet & Clank Future: Quest for Booty; Kiera in Jak and Daxter series; and Juliet Starling, the main character of Lollipop Chainsaw. She also has a minor voiceover for the teddy bear Ted in the motion picture Ted. In Blue Dragon, she is the voice actor for Kluke for the Xbox 360 game, but not in the anime series.

Beginning with the video game Batman: Arkham City, Strong would also succeed Arleen Sorkin as the voice of Harley Quinn.

She has appeared in live roles in National Lampoon's Senior Trip, Sabrina Goes to Rome, Sabrina Down Under, and The Last White Dishwasher. She also made guest appearances on such shows as Forever Knight, Street Legal, Touched by an Angel, Take Home Chef, Party of Five, Comic Book: The Movie, Kung Fu: The Legend Continues, 3rd Rock from the Sun and The Drew Carey Show. In January 2013, she voiced the character Plum in Cartoon Hangover's Bravest Warriors, created by Pendleton Ward. She recurred as Miss Collins in Nickelodeon's live-action series Big Time Rush from 2010 to 2013.

In 2004, she won an Interactive Achievement Award for her role as Rikku in Final Fantasy X-2. She also served as the announcer for the 1999 Kids' Choice Awards, appeared as a guest panelist at several fan conventions (including BotCon, Jacon, Comic-Con International, and Anime Overdose), and was featured on the front cover of the July/August 2004 issue of Working Mother magazine, in which she said, "My son is now old enough to respond to my work. To me, that's what it is all about." Strong has been nominated five times for Annie Awards.

In 2013, Strong won the Shorty Award for "Best Actress" for her use of social media. The Behind the Voice Actors website selected her for a BTVA Voice Acting Award for Voice Actress of the Year for 2013, having nominated her for 2011 and 2012.

Strong is currently starring in the Canadian series Pretty Hard Cases as Tiggy Sullivan, the head of a drug trafficking gang. She also voices Miss Minutes in the live-action Marvel Cinematic Universe series Loki.

Personal life
In 1999, Strong met U.S. real estate agent and former actor Craig Strong. The couple married on May 14, 2000, and have two sons named Sammy (born February 2002) and Aden (born August 2004). They lived in Los Angeles and were formerly the owners of VoiceStarz, an online company that taught people how to get into the voice-over business. On July 24, 2019, she filed for divorce, which was finalized on January 5, 2022.

In 2012, during the BronyCon event in New Jersey, Strong attended a lunch with fans from the military. In 2013, she was involved with a charity group called Bronies for Good, helping them raise funds for a family whose daughter had a brain tumor.

She follows a vegan diet and is a fervent supporter of People for the Ethical Treatment of Animals (PETA).

References

Citations

Sources

External links

 
 

1973 births
Living people
Actresses from Toronto
American film actresses
American television actresses
American video game actresses
American voice actresses
American animal rights activists
American veganism activists
Canadian child actresses
Canadian expatriate actresses in the United States
Canadian film actresses
Jewish American actresses
Jewish Canadian actresses
Canadian stage actresses
Canadian television actresses
Canadian video game actresses
Canadian voice actresses
Canadian animal rights activists
California Democrats
Cartoon Network people
Interactive Achievement Award winners
Shorty Award winners
20th-century American actresses
20th-century Canadian actresses
21st-century American actresses
21st-century Canadian actresses
21st-century American Jews